Filodrillia dolorosa is a species of sea snail, a marine gastropod mollusk in the family Borsoniidae.

Description

Distribution
This marine species has been found in the demersal zone of the Southeast Atlantic Ocean on the Agulhas Bank, South Africa

References

 Thiele, J. (1925) Gastropoda der Deutschen Tiefsee-Expedition. II. Teil. Wissenschaftliche Ergebnisse Deutschen Tiefsee-Expedition auf dem Dampfer “Valdivia” 1898–1899, 17, 1(35)–348(382), pls. 1(13)–34(46).
 Tucker, J.K. 2004 Catalog of recent and fossil turrids (Mollusca: Gastropoda). Zootaxa 682:1-1295.
 Stahlschmidt P. (2015). Description of three new turrid species (Gastropoda: Conoidea) from South Africa. Miscellanea Malacologica. 7(1): 13-18

Endemic fauna of South Africa
dolorosa
Gastropods described in 1925